Cigarroa may refer to:

Francisco G. Cigarroa (born 1957), American physician
Cigarroa High School, high school in Texas, United States
Cigarroa Middle School, middle school in Texas, United States